Poa humilis is a species of flowering plant belonging to the family Poaceae.

Its native range is Europe.

References

humilis